Souimun  (Hangul 	소의문, Hanja 昭義門; also known as Southwest Gate)  was one of the Eight Gates of Seoul in the Fortress Wall of Seoul, South Korea, which surrounded the city in the Joseon Dynasty. The gate was also known as Seosomun (서소문,  “West Small Gate”). The gate no longer exists, and there is a marker placed roughly where the gate once stood.

History
Souimun, which means “Promotion of Justice Gate,” was originally built in 1396. It was torn down by the Japanese authorities in 1914 during the early years of colonial rule of the country.

Commemoration

A marker has been erected near to where Souimun once stood. It is located next to a multi-storey car park structure, which is adjacent to the JoongAng Ilbo newspaper building on Seosomun-ro (street), in Jung-gu (district), in Seoul.

References 

Gates in Korea
Gates in South Korea
Buildings and structures in Seoul
History of Seoul